Cloforex (Oberex) is an anorectic of the amphetamine class. It is a prodrug to chlorphentermine. It never became a mass produced drug in part due to the side effects found in mice. Mice who consumed 75 mg of cloforex a day experienced weight loss along with pulmonary hypertension and hair loss.

References 

Anorectics
Substituted amphetamines
Carbamates
Chloroarenes
Prodrugs
Serotonin receptor agonists
Serotonin releasing agents